Aleksis is a given name, and may refer to:

 Aleksis Dreimanis (born 1914), award-winning Quaternary geologist
 Aleksis Kivi (1834-1872), Finnish author

See also

 Aleksy (disambiguation)
 Alexey (disambiguation)
 Alexis (disambiguation)
 Alexy (disambiguation)